The Rip Curl Pro 2016 was an event of the Association of Surfing Professionals for 2016 ASP World Tour.

This event was held from 24 march to 7 April at Bells Beach, (Victoria, Australia) and contested by 36 surfers.

The tournament was won by Matt Wilkinson (AUS), who beat Jordy Smith (ZAF) in final.

Round 1

Round 2

Round 3

Round 4

Round 5

Quarter finals

Semi finals

Final

References

2016 World Surf League
2016 in Australian sport
Sports competitions in Victoria (Australia)